The Latino Rockabilly War was a band most notable for backing The Clash frontman Joe Strummer on one album.  With Strummer, the Latino Rockabilly War created the album Earthquake Weather, released through Epic Records.  The album was well received by critics, but did not sell well and Joe Strummer lost his deal with Epic (excepting a hypothetical circumstance in which he decided to reform or re-create the Clash with the same or new musicians, in which case he would have been forced to work with Epic). Led by Strummer, they also contributed five songs to the soundtrack for the movie Permanent Record, which featured a young Keanu Reeves: "Trash City", "Baby the Trans", "Nothin' 'bout Nothin", "Nefertiti Rock", and the instrumental "Theme from Permanent Record".

In a segment of the documentary film Joe Strummer: The Future Is Unwritten, Anthony Kiedis mentions that during the period in which the bands' material was recorded, drummer Jack Irons (formerly of Red Hot Chili Peppers and Pearl Jam) was in residency at a mental institution. Therefore, Strummer had to arrange transportation and leave for Irons in order for him to participate in the bands' output.

The band toured with Strummer on the Rock Against The Rich Tour in 1988 with friends in tow, including film director Alex Cox.  Their sets included songs spanning Strummer's career to that point, including works from The 101ers and The Clash, material co-written with Mick Jones for Big Audio Dynamite's No. 10, Upping St. album, and a cover of The Pogues' song "If I Should Fall From Grace With God."

Members
Zander Schloss – lead and rhythm guitar
Lonnie Marshall – bass guitar
Joey Altruda – bass guitar (1988 on the Permanent Record-soundtrack)
Jim Donica – bass guitar (1988 on the Rock Against The Rich Tour)
Roberto Pla – percussion (1988 on the Rock Against The Rich Tour)
Willie MacNeil – drums
Jack Irons – drums

British instrumental musical groups
The Clash